Complexity is a peer-reviewed open-access scientific journal covering the field of complex adaptive systems. The journal's scope includes Chaos theory, genetic algorithms, cellular automata, neural networks, evolutionary game theory, and econophysics. It was established in 1995 and is published by John Wiley & Sons, since 2017 in collaboration with Hindawi Publishing Corporation.

Abstracting and indexing
The journal is abstracted and indexed in:

According to the Journal Citation Reports, the journal has a 2020 impact factor of 2.833.

See also
 List of systems science journals

References

External links
 

Publications established in 1995
English-language journals
Systems journals
Wiley (publisher) academic journals
Hindawi Publishing Corporation academic journals